Alfred Ader (17 October 1892 – 19 October 1941) was a Polish fencer. He competed in the team sabre event at the 1924 Summer Olympics.

References

External links
 

1892 births
1941 deaths
Polish male fencers
Olympic fencers of Poland
Fencers at the 1924 Summer Olympics
Sportspeople from Kraków
Polish Austro-Hungarians